Leopold Eugen Měchura (also Miechura; 2 February 1804 – 11 February 1870) was a Czech composer.

Biography
Měchura was born in Prague in 1804. He studied law at the Charles University in Prague, as well as piano and music theory. He then moved to the village Otín (today part of Klatovy), beginning his service as town justice in Klatovy. There he continued performing, both privately and in public, as well as composing. He composed many vocal pieces, and wrote church music as well; his operas took either Czech or German texts. Měchura's best-known work was the opera Marie Potocká, after a poem by Alexander Pushkin, which was premiered posthumously in 1871 at the National Theatre, Prague under the baton of Bedřich Smetana.

Měchura died in Otín in 1870, at the age of 64.

References

External links
Biography from Český hudební slovník osob a institucí

1804 births
1870 deaths
Musicians from Prague
Czech composers
Czech male composers
19th-century composers
Charles University alumni
19th-century Czech male musicians